Jensen! is a Dutch late-night talk show on the television station RTL 5. It airs on weekdays from 22:30 to 23:30 CET during winter, 20:30 to 21:30 UTC during summer.

The show's creator, anchorman Robert Jensen, also acted as its producer and host. In addition to various Dutch celebrities who accounted for the majority of the show's guests, Jensen often welcomed international celebrities who were interviewed in English with subtitles in Dutch.

On 29 March 2007, Jensen! became a subject of controversy in the United States as the show's guest that day, Snoop Dogg, delivered a few uncensored profanities directed at American TV host Bill O'Reilly.

International guests on Jensen! 

 La Toya Jackson
Shakira
Antonio Banderas
Pink
Lionel Richie
Simply Red
Tommy Lee
Uri Geller
Buck Angel
Bobby Farrell
Alek Wek
Naima Mora
Nicole Linkletter
Meat Loaf
Live
Lucie Silvas
Jackass
Sacha Baron Cohen as Borat
Dana International
Kim Wilde
Kate Ryan
Sugababes
Jamie Oliver
Gordon Ramsay
Take That
Level 42
James Morrison
Simon Webbe
Westlife
Gavin DeGraw
Jack Wagner
Melanie C
Mika
Stacy Ferguson
Snoop Dogg
Edgar Wright, Simon Pegg, Nick Frost
Phil Collins
Dirk Benedict and Dwight Schultz from The A-Team
Philip Dewinter
Cameron Diaz
Gym Class Heroes
Fab Morvan
Kelly Rowland
Wentworth Miller
Dominic Purcell
Emily Deschanel
Jaslene Gonzalez
Enrique Iglesias
Sean Kingston
Matt Damon
Verne Troyer
David Guetta & Tara McDonald

References

External links 
 Official site 

2002 Dutch television series debuts
2018 Dutch television series endings
Dutch television talk shows
Dutch-language television shows
Television series revived after cancellation
RTL 5 original programming